Chamber of Commerce is a historic chamber of commerce building located at Rochester in Monroe County, New York. It is a four-story building in the Classical Revival/Beaux-Arts style designed by Claude Fayette Bragdon and built in 1916. A seven-bay addition to the building was completed in 1925.

It was listed on the National Register of Historic Places in 1985.

See also
 National Register of Historic Places listings in Rochester, New York

References

Office buildings in Rochester, New York
Office buildings on the National Register of Historic Places in New York (state)
Beaux-Arts architecture in New York (state)
Government buildings completed in 1916
National Register of Historic Places in Rochester, New York